The Battle of the Gulf of Roses, also known as action of 14 February 1795, was a minor naval engagement of the French Revolutionary Wars fought in the Gulf of Roses between a ship of the line of Juan de Lángara’s fleet and a French squadron of a frigate and a corvette. For orders of Lángara, the Spanish Ship of the Line Reina María Luisa of 112 guns, chased the French frigate, named Iphigenie, more than one day, forcing finally her to strike her colors. The corvette, which separated three days before in a storm, was supposed to be lost.

Several days later, on 30 March, when the Montañés of 74 guns was carrying the prize, she was attacked by a strong French squadron of eight ships of the line and two frigates which initially waved the Spanish flag. Thanks to her superior speed, she was able to reach the port of Sant Feliu de Guíxols, and after a hard fight in which she fired 1,100 cannonballs, the attacking forces were rejected with the only loss aboard the Montañés of three men killed and few wounded. The French withdrew to Menorca.

Notes

References 
 

Gulf of Roses
Gulf of Roses
Gulf of Roses
Gulf of Roses
1795 in France
Gulf of Roses